Default was a Canadian rock band formed in Vancouver in 1999. Since forming, the band has released four albums, and has sold more than a million records. The majority of their fan base is in Canada, but they had brief mainstream success in the United States with the release of their hit single "Wasting My Time".

The group disbanded in 2013 after a hiatus following the release of their fourth album, and lead singer Dallas Smith pursued a country music solo career. In 2018, Default announced that they were back together. The band also announced a tour in support of Stone Temple Pilots and Seether, and a co-headline tour with Ages of Days.

Between 1996 and 2016, Default was among the top 150 best-selling Canadian artists in Canada and among the top 50 selling Canadian bands in Canada.

History
Upon obtaining their demo tape, Chad Kroeger, the vocalist of fellow Canadian post-grunge/alternative rock band Nickelback, discovered the band, subsequently lending support and co-producing their first two albums. Default's 2001 debut album, The Fallout,  achieved success due to strong radio play of "Wasting My Time" and "Deny". In 2002 Default won the Juno Award for "Best New Group". On August 23, 2002, The Fallout was certified platinum by Canada's CRIA, and on April 30, 2003 it was certified platinum in the United States by the RIAA, signifying a million records sold.

On September 28, 2013 the band announced on their official Facebook page that the band were not splitting up, but taking a break and starting different projects. However, the members announced later in 2013 that they were going their separate ways.

Discography

Studio albums

Extended plays

Singles

Promotional singles

Music videos
Wasting My Time
Deny
Live a Lie
(Taking My) Life Away
Throw It All Away
Count on Me
I Can't Win
The Way We Were
All Over Me
Little Too Late
Turn It On
Yesterday's Song

Band members
 Dallas Smith – lead vocals, occasional rhythm guitar
 Jeremy Hora – lead guitar
 Dave Benedict – bass
 Danny Craig – drums, percussion

See also

Canadian rock
Music of Canada
List of bands from Canada

References

Canadian post-grunge groups
Canadian hard rock musical groups
TVT Records artists
Juno Award for Breakthrough Group of the Year winners
Musical groups established in 1999
Musical groups disestablished in 2013
Musical groups reestablished in 2018
Musical groups disestablished in 2020
Musical groups from Vancouver
1999 establishments in British Columbia